The FIS Cross-Country World Cup Finals is a cross-country skiing event held annually since the 2007–08 season in various places in Europe or Canada. The World Cup Finals is a Stage World Cup event in the FIS Cross-Country World Cup, and are held as the last World Cup race weekend of the season. The inaugural World Cup Finals was held in 2008 in Bormio, Italy. As of the 2018–19 season, the World Cup Finals consists of three stages; a sprint, a mass start race and a pursuit.

The first stages was arranged on 14 March 2008 and were won by Claudia Künzel (ladies) and Pietro Piller Cottrer (men). The first overall winners of the World Cup Finals were Virpi Kuitunen and Vincent Vittoz.

Venues

Prize money
As of the 2018–19 edition, a total of CHF 240,000, both genders included, is awarded in cash prizes in the race. The overall winners of the World Cup Finals receive CHF 22,500, with the second and third placed skiers getting CHF 17,500 and CHF 11,000 respectively. All finishers in the top 20 are awarded money.  CHF 5,000 is given to the winners of each stage of the race, with smaller amounts given to places 2 and 3.

Overall winners

Records

Overall winners
Six skiers have won the World Cup Finals two or more times. Marit Bjørgen (NOR) is the only skier to win six times. Petter Northug (NOR) has won the World Cup Finals three times.

World Cup points
The overall winner are awarded 200 points. The winners of each of the three stages are awarded 50 points. The maximum number of points an athlete can earn is therefore 350 points.

References

Sources
 

 
Cross-country skiing competitions
FIS Cross-Country World Cup
Skiing competitions in Europe
Cross-country skiing in North America
March sporting events
2008 establishments in Europe
Recurring sporting events established in 2008